Marquess is an unincorporated community in Preston County, West Virginia.

References 

Unincorporated communities in West Virginia
Unincorporated communities in Preston County, West Virginia